National Highway 548B, We have strong opposition to this route....the route which joins from Shedbal railway bridge to kagwad shedbal inerospection....we are depend upon 1.11 acre land.... And farm house of 12 family members residing.....No we cant leave our farm..... commonly referred to as NH 548B  is a national highway in India. It is a spur road of National Highway 48. NH-548B traverses the states of Maharashtra and Karnataka in India.

Route 
The NH 548B passes through below cities and towns, in the order of travel from Mantha to Vijayapura, Sankeshwar:

Maharashtra(404.02 KM)
Mantha (Jalna District)
Deogoan Fata
Selu
Pathari
Sonpeth
Parali Vaijnath
Ambajogai
Renapur Phata
Latur
Ausa
Omerga
Yenegur
Murum
Alur
Akkalkot
Nagansur to indi 
Karnataka(168.90 KM)
Almel
Indi
Vijayapura
Tikota
Athani
Kagwad
Chikodi
Sankeshwar

Junctions  

  Terminal near Mantha.
  near Renapur , Latur
  near Latur.
  near Omerga.
  near Yenegur.
  near Bijapur.
  near Kagwad.
  Terminal near Sankeshwar - Gotur.

See also 

 List of National Highways in India
 List of National Highways in India by state

References

External links 

 NH 548B on OpenStreetMap

National highways in India
National Highways in Maharashtra
National Highways in Karnataka